Campylanthus is a genus of flowering plants belonging to the family Plantaginaceae.

Its native range is Macaronesia, Northeastern Tropical Africa, Arabian Peninsula, Pakistan.

Species:

Campylanthus anisotrichus 
Campylanthus antonii 
Campylanthus chascaniflorus 
Campylanthus glaber 
Campylanthus hajarensis 
Campylanthus hubaishanii 
Campylanthus incanus 
Campylanthus junceus 
Campylanthus mirandae 
Campylanthus parviflorus 
Campylanthus pungens 
Campylanthus ramosissimus 
Campylanthus reconditus 
Campylanthus salsoloides 
Campylanthus sedoides 
Campylanthus somaliensis 
Campylanthus spinosus 
Campylanthus yemenensis

References

Plantaginaceae
Plantaginaceae genera